The Fife Free Press is a local weekly newspaper published by JPIMedia. It is based in Kirkcaldy and is sold in central and southern Fife.

The newspaper was first published in 1871.  It was called the Fife Free Press, & Kirkcaldy Guardian until 1892 when the name was changed to the Fife Free Press. In November 2010, the format of the paper was changed from broadsheet, which had been the format since its first publication, to tabloid. In 2013 it had an average circulation of 11,510.

See also
 List of newspapers in Scotland

References

External links
 Fife Today
 Fife Free Press at 150: Kirkcaldy's penny paper which became an institution
 Fife Free Press 150: Back pages are a record of sporting success
 Farewell to Kirk Wynd: New era as Fife Free Press moves to new home
 Fife Free Press: 150 years at the heart of its community
 Fife Free Press foundations:: Responsible leadership and staff loyalty

Newspapers published in Scotland
Kirkcaldy
1871 establishments in Scotland
Publications established in 1871
Newspapers published by Johnston Press